Pekka Matti Harttila (born 1941) is a Finnish diplomat and a lawyer. He has served as Assistant Director in the Ministry for Foreign Affairs of the Ministry for Foreign Affairs from 1986 to 1988, Ambassador in Riyadh 1988–1991, Consul General in Berlin 1991-1994 and Head of Press and Culture Division since 1995. He has again been Ambassador in Bucharest 2000–2004

References 

1941 births
Ambassadors of Finland to Saudi Arabia
Ambassadors of Finland to Romania
20th-century Finnish lawyers
Living people